Jana Rodriguez Hertz born February 1977 is an Argentine and Uruguayan mathematician, professor, and researcher.

Biography
María Alejandra Rodriguez Hertz Frugoni was born in Rosario, Santa Fe, Argentina, February 11, 1970. She is the daughter of Mariana Frugoni and Adolfo Rodriguez Hertz. Jana is the oldest of five siblings, one of whom, Federico is also a mathematician.

Rodriguez Hertz studied mathematics at the Facultad de Ciencias Exactas, Ingeniería y Agrimensura of the National University of Rosario, Rosario, Argentina. She studied one year at the Instituto Nacional de Matemática Pura e Aplicada (IMPA) in Rio de Janeiro, Brazil. Since 1994, Rodriguez Hertz has been based in Uruguay. She earned a doctorate from the University of the Republic in Montevideo, Uruguay, in 1999.

Rodriguez Hertz works on dynamical systems and ergodic theory. She is a professor at the Faculty of Engineering at the University of the Republic. She is the first and only woman with a Grade 5 in mathematics in Uruguay.

Since 2011, Rodriguez Hertz has been involved in the Uruguayan educational debate. She has participated in numerous interviews, public events and conferences on the subject. She has developed a critical point of view on the educational budget, PISA tests, teaching career development, and other topics. Her particular point of view made her a benchmark of public opinion on the issues. She has been a columnist in different media, highlighting her participation in 2014 in the "La Tertulia" episode of the program En Perspectiva by Emiliano Cotelo on Radio El Espectador, as well as the "Jana y sus hermanas" and the "Suena Tremendo" episodes on the same radio station. She is also the author of the blog, "¿Y por qué no?".

In 2016, Rodriguez Hertz was elected a Regional Vice President, Latin America & the Caribbean, of the Organization for Women in Science for the Developing World for the period of 2016–20.

Her husband is Raúl Ures; they are the parents of two children.

Awards and honours 
 1992, Premio Jóvenes Notables, Fundación Bolsa de Comercio de Buenos Aires.
 1999, Investigadora Grado 3, PEDECIBA Matemática.
 2004, Premio Fondo Nacional de Investigadores, CONICYT.
 2009, Investigadora Nivel II, Sistema Nacional de Investigadores, SNI, ANII.
 2013, Investigadora de Primer Nivel, Grado 5, Programa de Desarrollo de las Ciencias Básicas (PEDECIBA).

References

External links 
 
 
 Jana Rodríguez Hertz at Academia.edu
 Jana Rodríguez Hertz at ResearchGate

Argentine bloggers
Argentine women bloggers
1970 births
Living people
People from Rosario, Santa Fe
20th-century Argentine mathematicians
Argentine women mathematicians
20th-century Uruguayan mathematicians
National University of Rosario alumni
Instituto Nacional de Matemática Pura e Aplicada alumni
University of the Republic (Uruguay) alumni
Academic staff of the University of the Republic (Uruguay)
21st-century Uruguayan writers
21st-century Uruguayan women writers
Uruguayan bloggers
Uruguayan women bloggers
21st-century Uruguayan mathematicians